Magdalenów may refer to the following places:
Magdalenów, Greater Poland Voivodeship (west-central Poland)
Magdalenów, Bełchatów County in Łódź Voivodeship (central Poland)
Magdalenów, Łask County in Łódź Voivodeship (central Poland)